Dávid Miklós Sigér (born 30 November 1990) is a Hungarian professional footballer who plays as a midfielder for Ferencváros and the Hungary national team.

Club career

Ferencváros
On 16 June 2020, he became champion with Ferencváros by beating Budapest Honvéd FC at the Hidegkuti Nándor Stadion on the 30th match day of the 2019–20 Nemzeti Bajnokság I season.

On 29 September 2020, he was member of the Ferencváros team which qualified for the 2020–21 UEFA Champions League group stage after beating Molde FK on 3-3 aggregate (away goals) at the Groupama Aréna.

International career 
Sigér made his debut for the Hungary national team on 5 September 2019 in a friendly against Montenegro, as a half-time substitute for László Kleinheisler.

On 1 June 2021, Sigér was included in the final 26-man squad to represent Hungary at the rescheduled UEFA Euro 2020 tournament.

Career statistics

Club

International goals

Scores and results list Hungary's goal tally first, score column indicates score after each Sigér goal.

Honours

Ferencvárosi TC
 Nemzeti Bajnokság I: 2018–19, 2019–20, 2020–21, 2021-22
 Magyar Kupa: 2021-22

References

External links
MLSZ 
HLSZ 

1991 births
Living people
Sportspeople from Debrecen
Hungarian footballers
Hungary international footballers
Association football midfielders
Debreceni VSC players
Létavértes SC players
Mezőkövesdi SE footballers
Balmazújvárosi FC players
Ferencvárosi TC footballers
Nemzeti Bajnokság I players
UEFA Euro 2020 players